The Women's singles luge competition at the 1976 Winter Olympics in Innsbruck was held from 4 to 7 February, at Olympic Sliding Centre Innsbruck.

Results

References

Luge at the 1976 Winter Olympics
1976 in women's sport
Lug